Karl Pedersen may refer to:

 Karl Pedersen (footballer)
 Karl Pedersen (wrestler), Norwegian wrestler
 Karl Pedersen (chess player), Danish chess player